Neftali is a given name. Notable people with the name include:

Neftalí Díaz (born 1971), Panamanian football player
Neftalí Feliz (born 1988), Dominican right-handed pitcher for the Pittsburgh Pirates of Major League Baseball
Neftalí Garzón Contreras (born 1948), Mexican politician from the Party of the Democratic Revolution
Neftalí Luna (born 1979), Spanish football player
Neftali Manzambi (born 1997), Swiss football player
Jonatan Neftalí (born 1984), Spanish football player
Ricardo Elecier Neftalí Reyes Basoalto, known as Pablo Neruda (1904–1973), Chilean poet-diplomat and politician
Neftalí Rivera (1948–2017), Puerto Rican basketball player
Neftalí Soto, farmer, attorney and former Secretary of Agriculture of Puerto Rico
Neftalí Soto (baseball) (born 1989), Puerto Rican professional baseball player
Neftalí Ayungua Suárez (born 1936), Mexican potter from Patamban, Michoacán, named a "grand master" of Mexican folk art

See also
Naphtali, a Biblical son of Jacob
Naphtali (name)

es:Neftalí
it:Neftali